Olivia Meier (born 14 April 1999) is a Canadian para badminton player who competes in both singles and doubles competitions in international level events. She qualified to represent Canada at the 2020 Summer Paralympics, in women's singles SL4.

Meier is a two time recipient of the Petro Canada FACE program. Meier was named the Canadian Para-Badminton athlete of the year by Badminton Canada in 2020, following her gold and silver medals at the Parapan American games. She is currently sponsored by YONEX Canada, SpiderTech, and is a Bell Canada athlete.

Personal life 
Meier has a disability called hemiparesis. She began playing badminton aged eight, out of the Winnipeg Winter Club, and started competing at age ten. She completed her undergraduate studies at the University of Manitoba. She is currently a law student at the University of Ottawa.

Achievements

Parapan American Games 
Women's singles

Mixed doubles

Pan Am Championships 
Women's singles

Women's doubles

Mixed doubles

BWF Para Badminton World Circuit (1 runner-up) 
The BWF Para Badminton World Circuit – Grade 2, Level 1, 2 and 3 tournaments has been sanctioned by the Badminton World Federation from 2022.

Women's singles

References

Notes

External links
 
 

1999 births
Living people
Canadian female badminton players
Medalists at the 2019 Parapan American Games
Canadian para-badminton players
Paralympic badminton players of Canada
Badminton players at the 2020 Summer Paralympics